Peru competed in the 2015 Pan American Games in Toronto, Canada from July 10 to 26, 2015.

On July 2, 2015 squash player Diego Elías was named the flagbearer of the team during the opening ceremony.

It was the second best participation of Peru in Pan American Games adding 12 medals to his historic count winning 3 gold, 3 silver and 6 bronze medals. The best participation of Peru was in Buenos Aires 1951.

Water skiing athlete Natalia Cuglievan, Karate Alexandra Grande and veteran shooter Francisco Boza won gold medals. .

Competitors
The following table lists Peru's delegation per sport and gender.

Athletics

Badminton

Peru qualified a full team of eight athletes (four men and four women).

Men

Women

Women

Boxing

Peru qualified three boxers (one man and two women).

Canoeing

Sprint
Peru received one wildcard in women's canoeing.

Women

Cycling

Diving

Peru qualified two male divers.

Men

Equestrian

Peru qualified a full team in the jumping event, however the country only entered one athlete into the individual competition.

Individual

Fencing

Peru qualified 1 fencer (1 woman).

Football

Men's tournament

Peru qualified a men's team of 18 athletes.

Roster

Group A

Golf

Peru qualified a full team of four golfers.

Gymnastics

Artistic
Peru qualified 4 athletes.

Men
Individual

Qualification Legend: Q = Qualified to apparatus final

Women
Individual

Qualification Legend: Q = Qualified to apparatus final

Judo

Peru qualified a team of four male judokas.

Men

Karate

Peru qualified 3 athletes.

Women

Modern pentathlon

Peru qualified a team of 3 athletes (2 men and 1 woman).

Men

Rowing

Peru qualified 2 boats and three male athletes.

Qualification Legend: FA=Final A (medal); FB=Final B (non-medal); R=Repechage

Sailing

Peru qualified 6 boats (10 sailors).

Men

Women

Open

Shooting

Peru qualified ten shooters.

Veteran Francisco Boza added a medal gold to his remarkable career in Shooting Fosa on July 14th.

Squash

Swimming

Synchronized swimming

Peru qualified a full team of nine athletes in the team competition only, after Colombia declined its quota earned at the 2014 South American Aquatics Championships. Maria Castillo was the 9th member of the team (reserve) and did not compete in either round of the team competition.

Table tennis

Peru has qualified a women's team and three single men.

Men

Women

Taekwondo

Peru qualified a team of three athletes (one man and two women).

Tennis

Peru qualified one athlete in the women's singles event.

Women

Triathlon

Volleyball

Women's tournament

Peru qualified a women's team of 12 athletes.

|}

Water skiing

Peru qualified a team of four water skiing athletes.

Men

Women

Weightlifting

Peru qualified a team of 4 athletes (2 men and 2 women).

Wrestling

Peru qualified 7 wrestlers.

Men

Women

See also
Peru at the 2016 Summer Olympics

References

Nations at the 2015 Pan American Games
P
2015